Kaliva Range (‘Hrebet Kaliva’ \'hre-bet ka-'li-va\ is the mostly ice-covered range extending 24.7 km in southeast-northwest direction and 10 km wide, rising to 1771 m (Mount Ader) in the northwest foothills of Detroit Plateau and partly on Chavdar Peninsula, on the border between Davis Coast and Danco Coast in Graham Land, Antarctica. It is separated from Lale Buttress on the southeast by Sinitovo Gap, and surmounts Breguet Glacier to the south, Gregory Glacier to the southwest, Tumba, Samodiva and Pirin Glaciers to the north, and Wright Ice Piedmont to the northeast.

The range is named after the ancient fortress of Kaliva in Southeastern Bulgaria.

Location
British mapping in 1978.

Maps
British Antarctic Territory. Scale 1:200000 topographic map. DOS 610 Series, Sheet W 64 60. Directorate of Overseas Surveys, Tolworth, UK, 1978.
 Antarctic Digital Database (ADD). Scale 1:250000 topographic map of Antarctica. Scientific Committee on Antarctic Research (SCAR). Since 1993, regularly upgraded and updated.

Notes

References
 Bulgarian Antarctic Gazetteer. Antarctic Place-names Commission. (details in Bulgarian, basic data in English)
 Kaliva Range. SCAR Composite Gazetteer of Antarctica.

External links
Kaliva Range. Copernix satellite image

Mountain ranges of Graham Land
Bulgaria and the Antarctic
Danco Coast